Lignerolles is a commune in the Eure department in Normandy in northern France.

World War II
After the liberation of the area by Allied Forces in 1944, engineers of the Ninth Air Force IX Engineering Command began construction of a combat Advanced Landing Ground outside of the town.  Declared operational on 18 July, the airfield was designated as "A-12", it was used by several fighter groups which flew P-47 Thunderbolts until late August.  Afterward, the airfield was used for resupply and casualty transport. It was closed in early November.

Population

See also
Communes of the Eure department

References

Communes of Eure